Charles Hirshberg is an American journalist and sportswriter.  He primarily writes for large-circulation magazines. His articles and columns have appeared in Time, Sports Illustrated, Life, the Los Angeles Times, The Washington Post, Men's Health and other publications.  As of 2002, he was an editor of Popular Science. His mother was the astrophysicist Joan Feynman and his uncle was Nobel Prize-winning physicist Richard Feynman.

Bibliography 
Hirshberg is the author of several books:

References

American people of Polish-Jewish descent
American people of Russian-Jewish descent
American sportswriters
Jewish American writers
Living people
Year of birth missing (living people)
21st-century American Jews